Black River Falls High School is a public school serving grades 9 through 12 in Black River Falls, Wisconsin, United States.

Administration
The principal is Luke Madsen. Kim Penza is the assistant principal.

Academics

Black River Falls High School offers courses in English, special education, math, science, social studies, family and consumer education, and more. The Black River Falls technology education department includes CAD, woodworking,  metals, and auto mechanics.

Extra-curricular activities 
Extra-curricular clubs include Family, Career and Community Leaders of America (FCCLA), National Honor Society, Student Senate, and its student media--The Breeze, Paw Print Online, and Channel 97.

Sports
Black River Falls is a Division 3 high school in the Coulee Conference. Sports offered include football, basketball, cheerleading, baseball, volleyball, tennis, cross country, track, wrestling, golf, softball, and hockey. In the 2007 spring season, the BRFHS golf team qualified for the state meet, finishing seventh out of eight in the competition.

Notable alumni
Larry D. Gilbertson, politician and lawyer
Mark Radcliffe, politician and lawyer
Jack Taylor, holds the National Collegiate Athletic Association all-divisions basketball record for most points in a single game (138)

References

External links
Black River Falls High School

Public high schools in Wisconsin
Schools in Jackson County, Wisconsin